Sugar Mama may refer to:

Food
 Sugar Mama (confectionery), a candy

Arts and media
 "Sugar Mama" (song), a Tampa Red song
 Sugar Mama, an album by The Dirty Rooks
 "Sugar Mama", a song by Dua Saleh
 "Sugar Mama", a song by Bitter:Sweet from Drama

See also 
Sugar mama, a woman who offers support (typically financial and material) to a younger companion in exchange for romantic or sexual pleasure
 Suga Mama (disambiguation)